Olga Vasilyeva may refer to:

 Olga Vassiljeva (born 1977), Estonian figure skater
 Olga Vasilyeva (footballer) (born 1974), former Russian football defender
 Olga Vasilyeva (actress) (born 1972), Russian film and stage actress
 Olga Vasilieva (politician) (born 1960), Russian politician and scientist, first female Minister of Education of Russia